Bai Langning (born 17 April 2002) is a Chinese professional snooker player.

Bai is among ten Chinese players currently suspended from the professional tour amid a match-fixing investigation. In January 2023, the WPBSA charged him with being concerned in fixing a match.

Career

Early career
Bai Langning was born in Jilin, and started playing snooker at the age of 7. After showing great talent at a young age, he moved to Shenzhen in 2015 and was coached by Roger Leighton at the Wiraka Academy, joining students Luo Honghao, Fan Zhengyi, Chen Zifan, Chang Bingyu and Wu Yize, who all went on to become professional players. Leighton described Bai's style as 'like a young Judd Trump'.

In September 2018, Bai Langning won a CBSA tour event in Foshan, beating Au Chi-wai in the final. He attributed this win to his improved safety play, and commented that his next goal was to become a professional player.

In 2019 Bai Langning was awarded a two-year professional tour card, finishing second on the CBSA China Tour amateur rankings, behind Chang Bingyu. The pair moved to Darlington in the UK, as part of the Q House Academy managed by Chusak Phetmalaikul.

2019/20 season
Bai's professional career started slowly, with only two wins against Jimmy White and James Cahill, an amateur. In the Shoot-out, Bai made a 72 break, but his opponent Daniel Wells managed to equalise the score. The frame was decided by a blue ball shoot-out, which Bai fluked, but such flukes were unfortunately not permitted in this format.

With the COVID-19 outbreak, Bai returned to China, and did not return for the resumption of the season. He finished the season ranked 121.

2020/21 season
The start of the professional season was delayed by the ongoing pandemic, but Bai decided not to return to the UK on the advice of his parents.

The only snooker tournament to be held in China during the 2020–21 season was the China City Teams event in December, in Xi'an. Only two current professional players were able to attend (Mei Xiwen also stayed in China for family reasons). Bai played for the Guangzhou team alongside former professional Fang Xiongman and CBSA Academy graduate Huang Jiahao. Guangzhou won the tournament, beating Xinjiang in the final.

In March 2021, Bai Langning returned to the UK to play in the World Championship. He defeated Allan Taylor, Alan McManus and Ben Woollaston to reach the final qualifying round. There, he led Martin Gould 5–2 before the experienced Gould took control, winning the last eight frames. This loss meant he was relegated from the tour, ranked 102.

In attempt to regain his tour card, Bai Langning entered Q School. In the first event, Bai lost to Fraser Patrick in the last round. Subsequent losses to Sydney Wilson and Mitchell Mann in the other two events meant that Bai did not qualify for the 2021–22 tour. However, his total of 41 frames meant that he finished ninth on the amateur top-up list. With only 122 professionals, this would ensure invitations to most tournaments during the season.

2021/22 season
In the opening ranking event of the season, the 2021 Championship League, Bai reached the last 8 stage. He lost two matches and drew the other in the round-robin group.

Style
Bai Langning is a left-hander with a very sound technique, and features as the model player in Roger Leighton's training videos.

Personal life
When in the UK, Bai Langning lives in Darlington and practices at the Q House Snooker Academy, coached by Mike Dunn.

Performance and rankings timeline

References

External links
Bai Langning at worldsnooker.com

2002 births
Living people
Chinese snooker players
21st-century Chinese people